The Book of Jasher (also spelled Jashar), which means the Book of the Upright or the Book of the Just Man, is a book mentioned in the Hebrew Bible, often interpreted as a lost non-canonical book. Numerous forgeries purporting to be rediscovered copies of this lost book have been written. A different interpretation identifies it as a reference to the Pentateuch, an interpretation which is notably favoured by the Jewish scholar Rashi in his commentary on the Hebrew Bible (see here-below his commentary on Joshua).

The translation "Book of the Just Man" is the traditional Greek and Latin translation, while the transliterated form "Jasher" is found in the King James Bible, 1611.

Biblical references 
The book is mentioned twice in the Hebrew Bible. A possible third reference exists with a variant spelling.

In Joshua 
According to the Book of Joshua, while Joshua was winning a battle against Adonizedek (king of Jerusalem) and his allies, Joshua prayed for the sun and moon to stand still. Joshua 10:13 then states:

The presence of this event in a book of poetry has been interpreted as a poetic description of the prolonged battle.

According to the medieval Jewish scholar Rashi, "Sefer HaYashar" in this verse refers to the Pentateuch: Jacob's prophecy regarding Joshua's ancestor Ephraim—"His seed will fill the nations"—was fulfilled when Joshua's victory gave him renown among the various nations who heard of the victory.

In Samuel 
According to the Book of Samuel, when David spoke his lament over the deaths of Saul and Jonathan, he began as follows:

The King James Version of the English Bible includes the words "the use of" in italics, material which its translator(s) added in order to render the text into what they considered understandable and comfortable English. According to some other translations (such as the English Standard Version), David taught his Judeans "The Bow", which they hypothesize was a poetic lament of the deaths of Saul and Jonathan. According to this interpretation, this "Bow" was a lament or a tune contained in the Book of Jashar which that book also says was taught to the Israelites. 

The Septuagint translation renders sefer hayashar in both cases as the 'book of the just'. It also misses the reference to the bow. It reads:

In Kings 
A possible third reference appears in 1 Kings 8. In the Septuagint (though not in the Hebrew text or in most translations), verse 8:53 says that the preceding prayer of Solomon is written "in the book of song". The Hebrew version of "book of song" could be , which is the same as "Sefer HaYashar" with two letters transposed.

See also 
 Book of Jasher (Pseudo-Jasher) – an 18th-century literary forgery which purports to be an English translation of the lost Book of Jasher.
Non-canonical books referenced in the Bible
 Sefer haYashar (midrash) – a Hebrew midrash, also known as The Book of Jasher, named after the lost Book of Jasher.

References 

Lost Jewish texts
Religious texts